Lovick P. Thomas (May 12, 1812 – May 24, 1878), was a quartermaster in the Confederate Army of the Confederate States of America, 1861–1863 and the father of famed American Old West Deputy U.S. Marshal Heck Thomas. His brother was Confederate Army Brigadier General Edward Lloyd Thomas.

Biography
Lovick Pierce Thomas was born in Clarke County, Georgia in 1812 and was the son of Edward L. Thomas and Mary Hogue. On May 6, 1834 in Clark County, he married a widow with three children, Martha Ann Fullwood Bedell (1810–1870). They had five children, three girls and two boys.  The youngest was Heck Thomas and the oldest, Lovick Pierce Thomas, II who served as an officer in the 42nd George Infantry during the American Civil War.
In 1850, he ran the Newton House Hotel in Athens, Georgia.  By 1860 he had moved his family to Rome, Georgia and was a tavern keeper.  At the beginning of the Civil War he was made Captain and Quartermaster of the 4th Battalion, Georgia infantry October 14, 1861. He transferred to 35th Regiment of Georgia infantry in 1862. He was known as the fighting quartermaster.  He helped carry General Joseph E. Johnston off the field when he was wounded at the Battle of Seven Pines. At Mechanicsville in the Battle of Beaver Dam Creek, June 26, 1862 he was wounded with a shot through the right lung but continued to serve.  September 21, 1863, he resigned due to increasing disability. "Nor can I [General Joseph R. Anderson] omit to call special attention to the gallant conduct of Capt. L. P. Thomas quartermaster of the 35th Ga., who volunteered his service for the occasion in the field, seeing his regiment deficient in field officers.  He rendered valuable service until he was seriously wounded" (Official Records, Series 1, Volume XI., Part II). By 1867 he was running a retail grocery business in Atlanta.  He died in 1887 and was buried in Oakland Cemetery.

References
 Huff, Frederick Ware. Four Families: Winn, Thomas, Ware, Garrett of the southern United States from 1600s to 1993. Kennesaw, GA., Frederick Ware Huff, 1993.

External links
  42nd Georgia Infantry
 

1812 births
1887 deaths
People from Clarke County, Georgia
People of Georgia (U.S. state) in the American Civil War
Confederate States Army officers
Burials at Oakland Cemetery (Atlanta)